Piers Torday (born 1974) is a British children's writer. The son of the novelist Paul Torday, he was born in Northumberland and was a theatre and television producer for many years.

His book The Dark Wild (2014) won the Guardian Children's Fiction Prize for 2014. After Torday's father died, leaving an unfinished novel manuscript The Death of An Owl, Torday completed the novel.

Torday's adaptation of John Masefield's The Box of Delights was performed at Wilton's Music Hall between 1 December 2017 and 6 January 2018 and revived at the same venue between 30 November 2018 and 5 January 2019

Works
 The Lost Magician, 2019
 The Frozen Sea, 2019
 The Last Wild, 2013
 The Dark Wild, 2014
 The Wild Beyond, 2015
 There May Be a Castle, 2016

References

1974 births
Living people
British children's writers
Guardian Children's Fiction Prize winners